Goulier (Languedocien: Golièr) is a former commune in the Ariège department in southwestern France. On 1 January 2019, it was merged into the new commune Val-de-Sos.

Population

Sights
 The Massot Cross
 The church
 Mill from the 18th century near the river
 Rente square, which lies at the north of the village, is the center of parties during the summer.
 The hole of Souzeton

The ski resort
The ski station the only ski resort of Vicdessos valley. It is one of the smallest ski station of the Pyrénées.

See also
Communes of the Ariège department

References

Former communes of Ariège (department)
Ariège communes articles needing translation from French Wikipedia
Populated places disestablished in 2019